Phoebe Pool (1913–1971) was a British art historian and spy for the Soviet Union.

Life 
Pool was born in London in 1913, the daughter of Gordon Desmond Pool and Agatha Eleanor Burrows. She was diagnosed with depression at an early age.

In 1931 Pool won a scholarship to Somerville College, Oxford, entering in 1932 to study history. In 1934, Pool was awarded the Deakin History Essay Prize, but her mental illness prevented her from taking her degree. After leaving university, she lectured for the Workers' Educational Association (WEA) before working at Westminster Tutors, London, from 1942. She also wrote reviews for The Spectator. During the Second World War she worked for Air Raid Precautions. In 1945 she published a poetry anthology, called Poems of Death.

Art historian 
In 1954, Pool studied Art History as an external student at the Courtauld Institute of Art, University of London. She received a BA in 1957 with first class honours and two years later she obtained her PhD with her thesis on the literary and philosophical background to the early work of Pablo Picasso. Her supervisor was Anthony Blunt, who was also a spy for the Soviet Union. Blunt and Pool wrote a book together, Picasso: The Formative Years: a Study of his Sources (1962).

In 1964 she began lecturing part-time at the University of Reading. Her book on Impressionism from 1967 became a popular success. Pool used the library of the Courtauld Institute of Art for most of her research. Her writing style was simple, but not simplistic.

Soviet spy 
In January 1934 Arnold Deutsch, an NKVD agent, was sent to London. Peter Wright, the author of Spycatcher (1987), claims that Deutsch established a spy network based around the University of Oxford. This included Phoebe Pool, Jenifer Hart, Bernard Floud and Goronwy Rees.

In 1963, Michael Straight faced a background check in response to an offer of government employment in Washington, D.C., and decided voluntarily to inform family friend and presidential special assistant Arthur M. Schlesinger, Jr. about his communist connections at Cambridge. This led directly to the exposure of Blunt as the recruiter of the Cambridge Five spy ring, who on 23 April 1964 admitted to Arthur S. Martin being a Soviet agent and named twelve other associates as spies including Phoebe Pool. Blunt told Martin that Pool had worked as his courier in the 1930s. MI5 arranged for Anita Brookner, another member of the Courtauld staff, to interview Pool. Pool confirmed Blunt's story and admitted passing messages with Hart to the Floud brothers from "Otto", identified as Arnold Deutsch. John Costello pointed out in his Mask of Treachery (1988) that "[t]his suggested that the Cambridge ring had spread its tentacles to Oxford."

Phoebe Pool committed suicide in December 1971 by throwing herself under a train.

Selected bibliography 
Pool, Phoebe and Stephenson, Flora. Plan for Town and Country. London: Pilot Press, 1944.
Pool, Phoebe. Poems of Death. 1945.
Pool, Phoebe and Blunt, Anthony. Picasso: The Formative Years: a Study of his Sources. Greenwich, CT: New York Graphic Society, 1962. 
Pool, Phoebe. Degas. London: Spring Books, 1963.
Pool, Phoebe. John Constable. Blandford, 1964.
Pool, Phoebe. Impressionism. New York: Praeger, 1967.
Pool, Phoebe. Delacroix. London: Hamlyn, 1969.
Pool, Phoebe. Paul Gauguin. New York: Funk & Wagnalls, 1978.

References

Further reading 
Blunt, Anthony. "Phoebe Pool." Burlington Magazine 114, no. 828 (March 1972): 177.
"Miss Phoebe Pool." The Times (London) December 28, 1971, p. 8.

1913 births
1971 deaths
20th-century English women
20th-century English people
Academics from London
Academics of the Courtauld Institute of Art
Academics of the University of Reading
Alumni of Somerville College, Oxford
Alumni of the Courtauld Institute of Art
British spies for the Soviet Union
British women historians
English art historians
Women art historians
Workers' Educational Association
1971 suicides
Suicides by train
Suicides in the United Kingdom